Peter Lennox-Kerr (1927 – 22 July 2007) was an internationally known British textile journalist.

Life

He was an expert reporting on the development of synthetic fibres.
He died in Derbyshire, on 22 July 2007.

Bibliography
 Index to man-made fibres of the world (editor)
 Flexible textile composites 1973
 The World Fibres Book 1972. Textile Trade Press
 Deskbook of World Fibers, McGraw-Hill, 1981,

References

1926 births
2007 deaths
British male journalists